Vrnjci is a village in the municipality of Vrnjačka Banja, Serbia. According to the 2011 census, the village has a population of 2,268 people.

References

Populated places in Raška District